Earthbeat is a landmark album by saxophonist Paul Winter. Recorded and released in 1987, the album was a joint project between the Paul Winter Consort and the Dmitri Pokrovsky Ensemble from Russia, then the Soviet Union.

Background
The Paul Winter Consort first met the Pokrovsky Ensemble during a tour of the Soviet Union in September 1986 when they performed together during a concert at Moscow University. Immediately inspired by their performance, the two groups communicated, through interpreters, the idea of making more music together. After obtaining permission from the Russian music label Melodiya, the Consort began their collaboration with the Ensemble.

The album was recorded in both Moscow and New York City. The two groups combined their musical styles to create an entirely new sound. The result was a melding of Russian circlesongs and folk melodies with Brazilian and African drums and harmonies, along with the western jazz harmonies implemented by the Winter Consort.

Release and reception
The album is considered monumental, as it was the first album of original music created by Americans and Russians together.
It received good reviews and was praised by other musicians, notably Pete Seeger and Dave Brubeck. The album was nominated for a Grammy in 1988.

Uses in other media
Russ Landau, a former bassist for the Paul Winter Consort, was asked to write music for the American TV show Survivor. Landau used portions of the first track on this album, "Kurski Funk", to create what became the theme song for the show. Paul Winter then sued the creators of Survivor, accusing them of using his music without his permission. According to Winter, Landau had asked to use music from Earthbeat, and Winter had only granted him permission to use recordings that did not make the final cut, and did not appear on the album.

Track listing
 "Kurski Funk" (Trad. Kursk, Halley, Castro-Neves, Winter)
 "The Horse Walked In The Grass" (Trad. Don, Halley, Freisen, Winter)
 "Kyrie" (Halley)
 "Steambath" (Trad. Pskov, Halley, Freisen, Winter)
 "Song For The World" (Trad. Kursk, Halley)
 "Down In Belgorod" (Trad. Belgorod, Castro-Neves, Freisen, Winter)
 "The Lake" (Halley)
 "Epic Song" (Trad. Caucasus, Castro-Neves, Winter)
 "Green Dreams" (Trad. Belgorod, Halley, Freisen, Winter)
 "Garden Of The Earth" (Trad. Russia, Halley, Winter)

Personnel
Paul Winter Consort
Paul Winter- soprano sax
Eugene Friesen- cello
Paul Halley- keyboards
Oscar Castro-Neves- guitar
Russ Landau- bass
Ted Moore- percussion
Glen Velez- percussion
Neil Clark- percussion

Dimitri Pokrovsky Ensemble
Dmitri Pokrovsky
Maria Nefadova
Alexander Donilov
Elena Sidorenko
Sergei Zhirkov
Tamara Smyslova
Arthur Partosh
Anna Knoukhova
Andrei Kotov
Nina Savistskaya
Dimitri Fokin
Vladimir Teplov
Irina Ponomaryova
Sergei Grigoriev

References

"Earthbeat." Living Music.
http://news.bbc.co.uk/2/hi/entertainment/1493961.stm

1987 albums
Living Music albums
Paul Winter albums